Seth Preston Beers (July 1, 1781 – September 9, 1863), sometimes listed as Seth P. Beers, was a lawyer and politician from Litchfield, Connecticut.

He attended Litchfield Law School, and was admitted to the bar in 1805. From 1820 to 1825, he served as the state's attorney.

He served in the Connecticut State House of Representatives from 1820 to 1823, serving as clerk in 1821, and was elected speaker in 1822 and 1823, as a Toleration Republican. He also briefly served in the Connecticut State Senate in 1824. He was the Democratic nominee for governor in 1838, and lost to incumbent governor William W. Ellsworth.

He is a sixth-generation ancestor of the actor James Spader.

References

1781 births
1863 deaths
People from Litchfield, Connecticut
Toleration Party politicians
Democratic Party members of the Connecticut House of Representatives
Democratic Party Connecticut state senators
Litchfield Law School alumni